Chaitra Pournami is a multi-sect multi-community Hindu festival observed on Purnima day of Chaitra month. It is celebrated across various parts of South Asia observed on full moon day in the month of Chithirai, corresponding in the Gregorian calendar to a day in April or May.

In some parts of India, The festival is dedicated to Chitragupta, a Hindu god who is believed to record humans' good and bad deeds for Yama, the Hindu god of death and the underworld. On this day, devotees ask Chitragupta to forgive their sins. On the festival day, many devotees bathe in rivers or other water bodies to symbolise their sins being washed away. This is especially popular at the river Chitra in the district of Tirunelveli  in Tamil Nadu, India.

In Kerala's capital, Thiruvananthapuram, there is an old temple of Chitra Pournami Valiya Thottam Bhagavathi at Pachalloor en-route Kovalam. Here, this festival has been celebrated for the last 200 years. The temple belongs to Melanganathil Veedu-Valiya Thottam Tharavadu of the region, which possessed almost all its people. This is a Hindu temple dedicated to Shakti or Bhagavathi.

This is called Chithira Pournami in Tamil Nadu and Kerala especially across followers of Kaumaram and Shaiva Siddhanta. Devotees observe fasting, worship Lord Murugan and break fast the next morning. The idea of moonlight helping to dispel darkness to the souls is the festive's motive. So Murugan worship and festival start on this day every year.

Significance 
The tale of Chitra Poornima is centred on Lord Indra, the Kings of Gods, and his Guru Brihaspati, according to the Thiruvilaiyadal Puranam and Tamil scriptures. Lord Indra and Guru Brihaspati once got into an argument over something Lord Indra said to Guru Brihaspati. Guru Brihaspati, Indra's master and advisor, gave him instructions to make a pilgrimage to the earth in order to atone for his negative karma.

After accepting, Lord Indra carried out his Guru's wish. Lord Indra discovered a shivaling while on the trip under the Kadamba tree. Later, he came to understand that it was Lord Shiva who was aiding him in lessening his bad deeds. He soon began presenting lotus flowers to Lord Shiva as an act of adoration. On the Chithirai month's full moon day, this incident occurred at Madurai city. Since then, devotees perform pujas at the famous Meenakshi Temple in Madurai to worship the Lord.

References

Hindu festivals
Hindu worship
Hindu holy days
Festivals in Tamil Nadu